Madison Rowlands is a British freestyle skier. At the 2016 Winter Youth Olympics, she won two medals for Great Britain, including Britain first Winter Youth Olympic Gold medal. She was due to compete at the 2018 Winter Olympics, but was injured earlier in the year.

References

Living people
2000 births
Freestyle skiers at the 2016 Winter Youth Olympics
British female freestyle skiers
Youth Olympic gold medalists for Great Britain